This article includes 2 lists of countries of the world and their total expenditure on health per capita. Total expenditure includes both public and private expenditures.

The first table and bar chart lists member countries of the Organisation for Economic Co-operation and Development (OECD). It shows each country's total spending (public and private) on health per capita in PPP international dollars.

The next table lists nearly all countries. It uses data from the World Health Organization (WHO). It also shows each country's total spending (public and private) on health per capita in PPP international dollars.

The top chart to the right measures the total cost of health care (public and private expenditures) as a percent of GDP (gross domestic product) for a few nations. GDP is a measure of the total economy of a nation. The chart below it shows that high life expectancy can be had across the range of health expenditures by country. See: List of countries by life expectancy.

Organization for Economic Co-operation and Development

Table 

Row numbers are static. Other columns are sortable. This allows ranking of any column. 

* indicates "Healthcare in LOCATION" or "Health in LOCATION" links.

Bar charts 

Health spending by country. US dollars per capita (using economy-wide PPPs). From OECD Data. "Government/compulsory": Government spending and compulsory health insurance. "Voluntary": Voluntary health insurance and private funds such as households’ out-of-pocket payments, NGOs and private corporations. In the first chart below they are represented by columns starting at zero. They are not stacked. The 2 are combined to get the total. OECD countries only in the first chart.

The chart below is older and breaks down the voluntary spending further by separating out-of-pocket payments. In this chart the items are stacked by color. There are a few other countries other than just OECD countries.

World Health Organization 

A country list from World Health Organization's Global Health Expenditure Database.

Table 2 
Row numbers are static. Other columns are sortable. This allows ranking of any column.

* indicates "Healthcare in LOCATION" or "Health in LOCATION" links.

See also

Health system
Health systems by country
List of countries by hospital beds
List of countries by life expectancy
List of countries by infant mortality rate
List of countries by quality of health care
List of OECD health expenditure by country by type of financing

Notes and references

Health expenditure
Health
Expenditure
Expenditure per capita
Health economics